These are the official results of the Men's Team Time Trial at the 1968 Summer Olympics in Mexico City, Mexico, held on 15 October 1968. There were 120 participants from 30 nations.

Final classification

References

Cycling at the Summer Olympics – Men's team time trial
Road cycling at the 1968 Summer Olympics